The 1957 Swedish speedway season was the 1957 season of motorcycle speedway in Sweden.

Individual

Individual Championship
The 1957 Swedish Individual Speedway Championship final was held on 11 October in Stockholm. Ove Fundin won the Swedish Championship for the second consecutive year.

Team

Team Championship
Dackarna won division 1 and were declared the winners of the Swedish Speedway Team Championship for the first time. The team included Rune Sörmander and Dan Forsberg.

The league increased to seven teams following the return of Vargarna, who had missed the previous two seasons due to financial issues.

See also 
 Speedway in Sweden

References

Speedway leagues
Professional sports leagues in Sweden
Swedish
Seasons in Swedish speedway